The fourth generation of the C/K series is a range of trucks that was manufactured by General Motors.  Marketed by the Chevrolet and GMC brands from the 1988 to the 2002 model years, this is the final generation of the C/K model line.  In a branding change, GMC adopted the GMC Sierra nameplate for all its full-size pickup trucks, leaving the C/K nomenclature exclusive to Chevrolet.  

Internally codenamed the GMT400 platform, GM did not give the model line a word moniker (i.e., "Rounded-Line series"). Pickups the Next Big Thing?|url=https://www.hotrod.com/articles/chevy-obs-pickups-performance-parts/|url-status=live|archive-url=https://web.archive.org/web/20200621040709/https://www.hotrod.com/articles/chevy-obs-pickups-performance-parts/ |archive-date=2020-06-21 |access-date=September 4, 2020|website=Hot Rod.com|publisher=MOTOR TREND GROUP, LLC.}}</ref>  In starting a different tradition, the model line overlapped production with both its predecessor and successor; the model line again shared body commonality with GM medium-duty commercial trucks.  

Over nearly a 14-year production run, the fourth-generation C/K was assembled by GM in multiple facilities in the United States, Canada, and Mexico.  After the 2000 model year, the fourth-generation C/K was discontinued and was replaced by the GMT800 platform (introduced for 1999); heavy-duty chassis cabs remained in production through 2002.  In line with the GMC Sierra, Chevrolet subsequently adopted a singular Chevrolet Silverado nameplate for its full-size truck line (which remains in use).

Development 
The development of the fourth-generation C/K began in the early 1980s with design operations headed by General Motors Truck and Bus Group.  Computers took on a greater role to develop the model line as GM used computer data to develop both components and tooling for the vehicle.  Key objectives included reducing weight (in the interest of improving fuel economy), improving aerodynamics and handling, and upgrading interior comfort.  The second model family to adapt the GMT platform nomenclature, the fourth-generation C/K ended the tradition of GM monikers for full-size trucks (i.e., Rounded Line, Action Line, Task Force, Advance Design), taking on the GMT400 internal codename.

Styled with straighter lines than its predecessor (to maximize interior space and improve functionality), the exterior of the GMT400 was designed to optimize aerodynamics (to further increase fuel economy).  Fitted with a flush, curved grille and front bumper, the body was designed with sedan-style doors with flush window glass.  Over a decade after their introduction by Ford and Dodge, GM designed an extended-cab configuration for the C/K line.  Nearly 20 years after removing them from its car lines, GM removed vent windows from the C/K trucks (the first full-size truck line to delete them).      

K-Series four-wheel drive trucks underwent multiple functional upgrades.  The solid front axle was replaced by independent front suspension (closer in configuration to C-Series trucks); operation of the transfer case was simplified with the standardization of a shift-on-the-fly system.  To enhance durability, the chassis was redesigned with a fully welded frame with a boxed front section for strength and rigidity; to better resist corrosion, additional galvanized steel was added to the body.

R/V series (1987–1991) 
For the 1987 model year, GM redesignated the Rounded-Line Series C/K trucks as the R/V series (R=rear-wheel drive; V= 4x4).   The nomenclature change was done to accommodate the launch of the GMT400 C/K; though launched for the 1988 model year, the newer product line went on sale in the spring of 1987.  In a more subtle change, the R/V trim levels were revised (to match the GMT400 C/K).      

For the traditional autumn launch of the 1988 model year, GM began to transition buyers further into the new model line, withdrawing -ton R/V trucks (-ton trucks were discontinued after 1989).  For 1990 and 1991, the R/V series consisted of 3500-series crew-cab pickups and chassis cabs, also serving as the basis of Suburban and Blazer/Jimmy full-size SUVs.    

For 1992, crew cabs/chassis cabs (and full-size SUVs) moved to the GMT400 chassis, marking the end of the Rounded-Line series after 18 model years.

Model history 
The fourth-generation GMT400 C/K model line was introduced in April 1987 for the 1988 model year.  Produced for nearly 14 years, the fourth-generation C/K underwent multiple minor revisions through its production, including a mid-cycle revision for the 1995 model year.

From 1988 to 1991, the model line was sold alongside its predecessor (the "Rounded-Line" C/K) and was sold alongside its successor (the GMT800 Silverado/Sierra) from 1999 to 2000.  For 2001 and 2002, pickup trucks were discontinued, with the model line sold only as a C3500HD heavy-duty chassis cab.

1988–1994 
For 1988, the fourth-generation C/K was introduced, including (nominal) -ton, -ton, and 1-ton pickup trucks and chassis cabs.  In a nomenclature revision, the 1500/2500/3500 payload series previously used by GMC was also adopted by Chevrolet (the Rounded-Line R/V series would do so for 1989).  At its launch, the new generation was offered in two cab configurations and three bed configurations; the extended cab was a first for GM full-size trucks.  

For 1990, Chevrolet and GMC pickup trucks underwent a minor exterior revision, with upper trims (Chevrolet Scottsdale/Silverado, and GMC SLX/SLE) replacing four sealed-beam headlamps with white-lens composite headlamps; base trims (Cheyenne and GMC SL) continued the use of two sealed-beam headlamps.  Two new versions (exclusive to Chevrolet) were introduced:  the W/T 1500 and the 454SS.  The W/T 1500 (W/T= Work Truck) was a de-contented version of the Cheyenne marketed primarily for work use; the 454SS combined elements of the Sport appearance package and the Silverado with the 7.4 L V8 of 3500-series trucks.

For the 1992 model year, the Rounded Line (R/V series) was retired (after 18 years), with GM moving the crew-cab pickups and full-size SUVs to the GMT400 model line (nearly 5 years after its introduction).  As its design had effectively been overtaken by that of the extended cab, the single-seat "Bonus cab" was not carried over (all crew cabs were now fitted with rear seats).  In another change, trim levels were reduced to two, with the mid-level Chevrolet Scottsdale and GMC SLX withdrawn.

For 1993, the body of the GMT400 saw few changes, introducing front bucket seats for extended-cab pickups.  For 1994, the body was largely carryover.

1995–1998 
For the 1995 model year, all GMT400 trucks underwent a mid-cycle revision, distinguished by a revision of the front fascia (for both Chevrolet and GMC).  The sideview mirrors were redesigned and enlarged (adopted from the Suburban SUV); on extended cabs, opening rear side windows became standard equipment.  Several updates coincided with safety mandates, adding a driver-side airbag to all 1500-series (and most 2500-series) vehicles, 4-wheel ABS, a center brake light (CHMSL), and a brake-shift interlock for the transmission.

For 1996, as a running change through the model year, extended-cab models received a passenger-side third door.  Introduced at nearly the same time as Ford (though a model year before), the feature was an option for all 1500-series extended-cab trucks.  The bench seat of Silverado/SLE-trim vehicles underwent a revision, with the center seatback converted to a fold-down armrest/console.   In another change, the GMT400 platform received daytime running lights as standard equipment.

For 1997, the dashboard underwent a minor revision to accommodate a passenger-side airbag (only vehicles with a GVWR under 8500 pounds were equipped, including 1500-series and non-HD 2500s).

For 1998, GM revised the tailgate badging for pickup trucks.  To reflect the 1996 divisional merger of GMC and Pontiac, "GMC Truck" became "GMC" on all Sierras; Chevrolet introduced a tailgate badge for Silverado-trim pickups matching Suburban and Tahoe SUVs.

1999–2002 
In August 1998, General Motors released the GMT800 generation of full-size pickups for the 1999 model year as the replacement for the fourth-generation C/K trucks introduced for 1988.  The long-running C/K nomenclature was retired by Chevrolet in favor of a singular Chevrolet Silverado nameplate (as GMC had done in 1988 with the GMC Sierra).

For the 1999 model year, GM continued sales of the fourth-generation C/K alongside its GMT800 successor, intending to use up leftover parts stock.  Newly rebranded the Chevrolet Silverado Classic and GMC Sierra Classic (dropping the Chevrolet Cheyenne), GM continued sales of the Classic in all three payload series.  Largely aimed towards fleet sales, to minimize production costs, the 1500-series Classic was offered only with the 5.0 L and 5.7 L V8 and an automatic transmission and much of the previous Silverado interior trim (in an effort to steer potential base-trim or W/T 1500 buyers towards the all-new Silverado).

For 2000, the Classic was pared down to the 2500 and 3500 series, with the model line reduced solely to the C3500HD chassis cab for 2001 and 2002.

Model overview 
The fourth-generation C/K pickup trucks were marketed by the Chevrolet and GMC divisions of General Motors.  Offered in 1500 (1⁄2-ton), 2500 (3⁄4-ton), and 3500 (1-ton) payload series, the C/K pickup trucks were sold in two-door standard cab, two or three-door extended cab, and four-door crew cab configurations.  In total, six wheelbases for pickup trucks were offered.  The C/K product line also included General Motors full-size SUVs (again derived from the body of the crew cab).

Chassis 

While again using perimeter-frame layout as the Rounded-Line C/K trucks, the fourth-generation chassis was an all-new design, adopting fully-boxed frame rails forward of the cab.  In a first for the model line, power steering became standard on all C/K trucks for 1988.  For 1997, the system was revised to a variable-ratio assist system.

Evolved from the previous generation, the front suspension for the GMT400 chassis is fully independent with unequal-length control arms.  C-series trucks used front coil springs, with front torsion bars for K-series trucks (the first American 4x4 pickups with unequal-length control arm front suspension).  The rear suspension configuration was largely unchanged, with rear leaf springs supporting the live rear axle, changing to a two-stage setup to improve load capability while improving ride characteristics while unloaded.

On all pickup trucks, the model line was fitted with front disc brakes and rear drum brakes (4-wheel disc brakes were exclusive to the C3500HD).  Anti-lock brakes (ABS) was introduced as part of the redesign.  From 1988 to 1994, ABS was used on the rear wheels (on K-Series trucks, only when in two-wheel drive).  From 1995 to 2000, pickups were equipped with four-wheel ABS.

A short bed extended cab model on a  wheelbase was introduced for 1989. In 1992, the crew cab was introduced in a  wheelbase (four inches longer than the R/V series) on 3500 models only, with a short bed model on a  wheelbase appearing for 1999, for both 2500 (SRW) and 3500 (DRW) models.

Powertrain details 

At its 1988 launch, the fourth-generation C/K pickup trucks shared its five-engine powertrain offering with the R/V series.  On 1500 series vehicles, a 4.3 L Vortec V6 was standard, with the options of a 5.0 L V8, 5.7 L V8 and a 6.2 L diesel V8.  On 2500-series and 3500-series vehicles, a 5.7 L V8 was standard, with a 7.4 L V8 and 6.2 L diesel V8 as options.  The 4-speed manual of the previous generation was carried over (for 3500-series trucks), with GM introducing a 5-speed overdrive manual (for 1500 and 2500-series vehicles).  A 4-speed overdrive automatic was an option on all engines (for 1500 and 2500-series vehicles); a 3-speed automatic was also offered (and was the sole automatic for 3500-series trucks).

For 1991, the THM400 gained a 4th gear and electronic controls, becoming the 4L80E; designed for over-8,600 lb GVWR, the transmission was paired with the 7.4 L and 6.2 L engines.

For 1992, GM introduced its first turbodiesel V8, expanded to 6.5 L displacement; the  engine was not offered in 1500-series trucks.  In another change, 4-speed manual transmissions (largely carried over from the R/V series) were discontinued (replaced by a NP4500 5-speed); along with overdrive, the heavy-duty transmission again offered a low-ratio first gear.

For 1993, the lighter-duty 700R4 (paired with engines up to the 5.7 L V8) was upgraded with electronic controls, becoming the 4L60E.

For 1994, naturally-aspirated versions of the 6.5 L diesel were introduced (replacing the 6.2 L engine entirely); both versions of the 6.5 L engine were offered in all three payload series of the GMT400.

For 1996, the three gasoline V8 engines underwent a series of design upgrades, becoming the Vortec 5000, 5700, and 7400, respectively.  To meet OBD-II compliance, the Vortec engines replaced throttle-body fuel injection with sequential fuel injection, redesigned engine camshaft and cylinder heads, along with longer-life engine coolant and spark plugs.  The naturally-aspirated 6.5 L engine was discontinued (the turbodiesel remained offered for all C/K trucks).

From 1997 onward, few major changes were made to the powertrain.  For 2001, the C3500HD chassis cab replaced the 7.4 L V8 with an 8.1 L Vortec 8100 V8, becoming the only GMT400 vehicle to use the engine.

Body design 
Introduced for 1988, the fourth-generation C/K marked the addition of the extended-cab body to the pickup truck line (trailing Dodge and Ford by nearly 15 years).  Offered with an optional rear bench seat, versions without one effectively replaced the single-seat "Bonus Cab" (previously derived from the crew cab).  For 1992 (nearly five years after the two-door pickups were released), a four-door crew cab was introduced.  As with the previous generation, the crew cab shared its body design with the Suburban SUV.

For pickup trucks, three different bed designs were offered in 61⁄2 and 8-foot lengths.  The fenderless Chevrolet Fleetside/GMC Wideside was again offered in both lengths; the dual rear-wheel dually bed was sold only in an 8-foot bed.  The long-running Chevrolet Stepside/GMC Fenderside was replaced by an all-new Sportside design.  Offered solely in a 61⁄2-foot length, the Sportside bed was a more modern design (sharing the bed sides, taillamps, and a revised tailgate), fitting the rounded fiberglass fenders of the Big Dooley bed with a narrower single rear-wheel axle and bodied with functional pickup bed steps.

For 2500 and 3500-series trucks, chassis cabs were also offered.  Assembled as C/K trucks with no pickup truck bed, the incomplete vehicles were fitted with aftermarket components by second-party manufacturers to complete fabrication of the vehicle.  For 1991, the heavier-duty C3500HD was introduced (developed specifically for commercial use).

Interior 
While losing nearly 4 inches of exterior width over its Rounded-Line predecessor, the fourth-generation C/K underwent an increase in interior size, gaining both legroom and seat travel.  While carrying over little more than the steering column, the model line evolved the driver-centered dashboard layout from its predecessor.  In an effort to modernize the interior, the model line shed all chrome trim from the cab interior (regardless of trim level), with hard plastic replacing many soft-touch surfaces.  The dashboard introduced a hybrid of digital and analog instruments, with digital scales replacing analog gauge needles.  In a functional change, all manual transmissions became floor-shifted (retiring the column-mounted shifter).  For 1991, the instrument panel replaced electronic gauges with analog counterparts, adding a tachometer as an option (for the first time since 1980)

Coinciding with the 1995 model revision, the interior underwent a substantial redesign, with the dashboard and door panels undergoing a redesign for the first time since 1988.  Along with the standardization of a tachometer, a double-DIN radio (integrating the cassette/CD player) was introduced, alongside a complete redesign of the climate controls.  The seats underwent a redesign; leather-trimmed seats became an option for the first time on a factory-produced GM pickup truck.

The 1995 interior design remained in use through the discontinuation of the fourth-generation model line, revised for the addition of a passenger-side airbag during the 1997 model year (for 1500-series and non-HD 2500-series vehicles).  For 1998, the steering wheel was redesigned (with a repackaged driver-side airbag); dual airbags became standard on all C/K vehicles (below 8500 lbs GWVR).

Trim 
On Chevrolet vehicles, the C/K nomenclature returned from the previous generation; "C" denoted two-wheel drive trucks while "K" denoted four-wheel drive vehicles.  While all GMC pickup trucks were now badged under a singular Sierra nameplate, GM still used C and K as internal model codes for both divisions.

In a marketing change, GM adopted the 1500/2500/3500 series previously used by GMC for both divisions (denoting -ton, -ton, and 1-ton nominal payload).

Chevrolet 
Carrying over the trim lines from the previous generation, Chevrolet marketed its C/K pickup trucks under three trim levels for 1988. The Cheyenne made its return as the standard trim (replacing the Custom Deluxe), with the Scottsdale and Silverado serving as the top two trims. Externally, the Cheyenne was distinguished by its two sealed-beam headlights; the Scottsdale and Silverado were fitted with four headlamps (replaced by rectangular composite headlamps for 1990). The trim levels had less distinguished badges as previous models, having miniature nameplates behind the cab on the B pillar before the bed; the Cheyenne name was in white on a black square above one gold line, Scottsdale in between two gold lines, and Silverado above three gold lines.

Intended primarily for fleet sales and work use, the Cheyenne was a spartan vehicle with most features offered as optional equipment.  Marketed more widely for retail sale, the Scottsdale standardized many optional features of the Cheyenne and added additional interior trim, cloth seating (bucket seats were an option).  Serving as the flagship, the Silverado featured the most chrome trim and a fully carpeted interior.

For 1992, the Scottsdale trim was dropped; the Cheyenne and Silverado trims were offered through 1998, with the Cheyenne badging updated to be similar to the previous Scottsdale badge. For 1999, to accommodate the introduction of its successor, the C/K was renamed the Silverado Classic.  The Silverado Classic adopted the trim nomenclature of its successor, with an unnamed base trim (replacing the W/T), LS (Cheyenne), and LS Premium (Silverado).

GMC 
In contrast to Chevrolet, the GMC division marketed the fourth-division C/K pickup trucks under the GMC Sierra nameplate.  For 1988, GMC replaced the Sierra Grande, High Sierra, and Sierra Classic of the previous generation with the SL (counterpart of the Cheyenne), SLX (Scottsdale), and SLE (Silverado).

Through production of the model line, GMC offered a counterpart of the Z71 and Sport option packages offered by Chevrolet, but would not market a version of the W/T 1500 or the 454SS pickup trucks.

Variants

Medium-duty trucks

GMT530 (1990–2002) 

For 1990 production, GM introduced an all-new medium-duty truck series (codenamed GMT530).  While no longer part of the C/K series, the Chevrolet Kodiak and GMC TopKick shared design commonality with their predecessors in adopting the cab design of C/K pickup trucks.  Following the 1987 exit of GM from heavy-truck production, the Kodiak/TopKick became the largest vehicles produced by the company.

Offered as both a Class 6-7 truck and as a cowled bus chassis, the GMT530 chassis was offered with 6.0 L and 7.4 L gasoline V8s (developed for commercial use); these were replaced by an 8.1 L V8.  As an option, Caterpillar inline-6 diesel engines were offered.

After 2002 production, the GMT530 chassis was discontinued and replaced by the GMT560 (which adopted its cab from GM full-size vans).

C3500HD (1991–2002) 

For 1991 production, GM introduced a C3500HD variant of the C/K for both Chevrolet and GMC.  Developed exclusively as a chassis cab vehicle, the C3500HD was intended to bridge the gap between the 2500/3500-series chassis cab trucks and the medium-duty Kodiak/TopKick.  Intended nearly exclusively for commercial use, the C3500HD was not sold for retail sale.

To raise its GVWR to 15,000 lbs, the C3500HD underwent multiple design modifications.  In place of the drop-center frame rails that C/K chassis cabs shared with the pickup trucks, the C3500HD received a heavier-duty straight frame.  The heavier-duty frame design led to several visible exterior design changes to the model line; as the cab was raised several inches, a filler panel was placed below the grille and bumper.  While factory-produced as a C-series truck, the front fenders were fitted with the plastic fender flares typically fitted to K2500 trucks to accommodate a wider front axle and larger (19.5-inch) tires.  The model line was offered in 135.5, 159.5, and 183.5-inch wheelbases, distinct from pickups and C/K chassis cabs.

The standard engine for the C3500HD was the 5.7 L V8 with the 7.4 L V8 as an option; the 6.5 L turbodiesel was introduced as an option for 1992.  The engines were paired to the 4L80E 4-speed OD automatic and the NV4500 5-speed manual transmissions.  The 5.7 L V8 and 7.4 L V8 were replaced by the newer 8.1 L V8 for 2001-2002. Both front and rear axles were leaf-sprung solid axles. In line with commercial trucks, the front axle was a solid I-beam drop axle; the rear drive axle was a  Dana 80 full-floating axle (11-inch ring gear).  While sharing the same ABS capability as the pickup trucks, the C3500HD was fitted with 4-wheel disc brakes.

Intended primarily for commercial and fleet use, the cab was fitted with marker lights and either "camper-style" or "west-coast" sideview mirrors.  Initially offered in only a standard cab with Cheyenne trim, the C3500HD was expanded to a Silverado trim for 1994; a crew cab became an option for 1996.  During its production, the C3500HD was not offered with an extended-cab body.

While GM produced the K2500 and K3500 as chassis-cab trucks, no K3500HD was ever produced from the factory by General Motors; several equivalent vehicles were fabricated through aftermarket conversions (including a Dana 60 or Dana 70 front axle).

The final C/K vehicle produced, the C3500HD, was discontinued after the 2002 model year and was not directly replaced.  Currently, the closest functional equivalent is the Chevrolet Silverado 4500HD (produced by Navistar).

The C3500HD was built in Janesville, Wisconsin and in Flint, Michigan for most of its life. The final 2 years, 2001-2002, were built in Toluca, Mexico.

Sport-utility vehicles 
For the 1992 model year, GM full-size SUVs underwent their first redesign since 1973, becoming part of the fourth-generation C/K model family.  Nearly five years after pickup trucks made their debut, the Suburban (marketed by both Chevrolet and GMC) was released, again derived from the crew-cab pickup truck body (itself debuting for 1992).  Alongside the Suburban, the Chevrolet K5 Blazer also adopted the fourth-generation C/K chassis, with GMC renaming the Jimmy as GMC Yukon (to eliminate nameplate confusion with the compact Jimmy).  In a substantial change to its body configuration, the Blazer/Yukon abandoned its lift-off hardtop for a permanent roof (effectively becoming a three-door version of the Suburban).

The Suburban was offered in both 1500 and 2500 payload series (the Blazer/Yukon, 1500-series, only); both vehicles were offered in both rear-wheel and four-wheel drive.  For 1995, Chevrolet retired the K5 Blazer name (following suit with GMC) with the Chevrolet Tahoe.  The same year, a five-door version of the Tahoe/Yukon was introduced (a short-wheelbase version of the Suburban with two rows of seats).

Following a decline in demand for large three-door SUVs (which led to the withdrawal of the Ford Bronco and Dodge Ramcharger), the three-door version of the Tahoe/Yukon was discontinued without a replacement.  To produce a full-size luxury SUV slotted above the Oldsmobile Bravada in both size and content, GM introduced the GMC Yukon Denali and the Cadillac Escalade.  Derived from the five-door Chevrolet Tahoe/GMC Yukon, the Yukon Denali and Escalade shared a nearly identical exterior (differing primarily in grilles and divisional badging).

Pickup trucks

W/T 1500 (1990–1998) 

For 1990, Chevrolet introduced the W/T 1500 (Work Truck) as the lowest-price version of the 1500-series.  Marketed towards vocational users, the W/T 1500 was a de-contented of the Cheyenne trim offered solely as a long-bed Fleetside truck.  Distinguished by its black plastic grille, steel wheels, and monochromatic paint, the W/T was offered with the 4.3 L V6 and a manual transmission as standard equipment.

One of the most spartan vehicles marketed by General Motors, the W/T 1500 lacked features such as air conditioning, an AM/FM radio, carpeting, or a full-length headliner; the former two were introduced (as options) through its production.  To streamline manufacturing costs, the W/T retained the ABS and dual airbags phased in during production.

Z71 (1989–1999) 

For 1989, the Z71 (Off-Road Chassis Package) option was introduced for both Chevrolet and GMC.  Exclusive to K1500s, the option package included skid plates for the engine, front axle, and transfer case along with heavy-duty Bilstein shock absorbers.  Distinguished by "Z71" bedside graphics and standard aluminum-alloy wheels

Offered on the Cheyenne (except W/T 1500), Scottsdale, and Silverado trims, the Z71 could also be combined with the Sport Equipment Package.  Following the withdrawal of the C/K 1500 for 2000, the Z71 option package ended production on the GMT400 generation, but Chevrolet and GMC have continued the use of the Z71 RPO code for off-road chassis packages for each successive generation of full-size pickups (to current production).

Sport Equipment Package (1989–1997)

For 1989, Chevrolet introduced a Sport Equipment Package as an appearance package for the C/K1500.  Paired with the 61⁄2-foot Fleetside truck bed and Silverado interior trim, the option package was offered in monochrome black, red, or white paint; the exterior was given a black grille and side mirrors, body-color bumpers, and "Sport" bedside and tailgate decals.

On two-wheel drive examples, the front bumper included a black air dam (with fog lamps); the 15-inch styled steel wheels were chrome-plated.  4x4 versions of the Sport Equipment Package were able to be combined with the Z71 package, and were painted exclusively in white; the "Sport" graphics were replaced by "4x4"; in line with 2500/3500-series trucks, the fenders received black wheel flares.

In contrast to the higher-performance 454SS, the Sport Equipment Package was offered with the 4.3 L V6 and 5.0 L V8 engines; a 5.7 L V8 replaced the 5.0 L for 1994.  Two-wheel drive versions were offered with an upgraded ZQ8 heavy-duty suspension option, including heavy-duty shocks and high-ratio steering.

From 1989 to 1992, the package was paired solely with the Fleetside bed; for 1993, Chevrolet shifted the option to the Sportside stepside bed.  In another change, the chromed steel wheels (shared with the 454SS) were replaced by cast-aluminum wheels for both two and four-wheel drive example.  The grille of the Sport package was revised, adopting a body-color version of the W/T 1500 grille.  Previously exclusive to Chevrolet, the option package became available for GMC Sierra 1500s.  For 1994, Teal Green replaced Summit White as a third exterior color (the latter returned for 1996).

After the 1997 model year, the Sport Equipment Package was dropped from the C/K model line.

454SS (1990–1993)

For 1990, Chevrolet debuted the 454SS as a high-performance variant of the C1500.  The newest American high-performance pickup truck since the 1989 Shelby Dakota, the 454SS was a 1⁄2-ton C1500 powered by a  7.4 L V8.

Deriving much of its design from the Sport Equipment Package, the 454SS was distinguished by a nearly monochromatic black exterior, gloss-black grille (with red-trim badging), and body-color bumpers and mirrors (borrowing the latter from the Cheyenne).  Externally identified by "454SS" bed-side decals, the vehicle received Silverado interior trim, with model-specific bucket seats and interior colors.

To improve the road manners of the vehicle, the 454SS received an upgraded suspension, including  Bilstein gas-filled shock absorbers, a  front stabilizer bar, and 12.7:1 fast-ratio steering gear assembly

Borrowed directly from the R/V and C/K 3500-series trucks, the  7.4 L V8 was mated to a 3-speed THM400 for 1990.

Initially offered solely in black paint and a red interior, Chevrolet introduced a choice of paint colors for the 454SS for 1992, adding red and white monochrome exteriors, along with blue, beige, and gray interiors.

Competing with the similar Ford SVT Lightning, the 454SS was produced through the 1993 model year.  In total, 16,953 examples were produced (13,748 were sold for the 1990 model year).

Export and foreign production

Australia and New Zealand  

In 1992, GM began imports of GMC trucks into Australia through its Holden division, exclusively for conversion to ambulances.  The trucks were GMC K2500s, powered by 6.5L turbodiesel V8 engines.  In contrast to the subsequent Holden Suburban, the vehicles were not sold to the general public and retained GMC divisional badging.

The ambulance conversion was done by Jakab Industries of Tamworth, New South Wales, who fitted a fiberglass hatchback body to the GMC chassis cab; the firm also converted the vehicles to right-hand drive.  The vehicles were developed as a successor for ambulances based on Ford F-series chassis (Ford of Australia ended importation of the F-Series for 1992).

While imported in highly limited numbers due to their specific use, Australian importation of the C/K chassis lasted through 1999 production.

In New Zealand, the national Ambulance Advisory Transport Board selected on the fourth-generation C/K in 1988 to replace vehicles based on Bedford and International Harvester chassis.  Beginning in 1989, the C2500 chassis cab was imported by General Motors New Zealand and locally converted to right-hand drive.  While exported from the United States with Chevrolet badging, GM New Zealand branded the vehicles with the Sierra nameplate (used by GMC in North America); conversely, GM Australia imported GMC-branded trucks.

Through the 1990s, "Chevrolet Sierras" served in the fleet of the St John Ambulance Service; as the C/K was replaced by the Chevrolet Silverado for 1999, subsequent imports to New Zealand were badged in line with its North American counterpart, serving as ambulances into the 2000s.

Brazil 
For 1997, General Motors do Brazil replaced the 10/20 series (a locally engineered derivative of the Rounded-Line generation introduced in 1985) with the GMT400-based Silverado.  The Silverado was offered with three engines: a Maxion 4.0 L inline-4 diesel, a 4.2 L MWM inline-6 turbodiesel, and a GM-sourced 4.1 L gasoline inline-6.  All three engines were paired to a five-speed manual transmission.  The final vehicle line to use the Chevrolet inline six, the Brazilian-produced Silverado was retired in 2001, with GM shifting production to the mid-size S10.

In Brazil, the C3500HD was offered as a GMC and was exported to Argentina and Uruguay as a Chevrolet.  Sharing diesel engines with the locally produced Silverado, the C3500HD was badged differently than its US-produced namesake.  Adopting the 6-100 and 6-150 nameplates, the series was named after its approximate GVWR in metric tonnes (approximately over 6 tonnes) and a rounded number for the PS horsepower rating for each engines (approximately 100 PS for the Maxion diesel and 150 PS for the MWM turbodiesel).

In Brazil, GM renamed a version of the short-bed C2500 pickup truck as the GMC 3500HD for 2000 and 2001. The GMC C3500HD pickup was produced only with the MWM diesel engine.

Motorsport

The Chevrolet C/K was used in the NASCAR Truck Series, starting in the inaugural 1995 season, after 7 previous exhibition races were demonstrated in 1994 and 1995. It was used up until the 1999 season, when it was replaced by its successor, the Chevrolet Silverado.

References

External links

Chevrolet trucks